Day Break is a television program for which one 13-episode season was produced. The series starred Taye Diggs as Detective Brett Hopper, who is framed for the murder of Assistant District Attorney Alberto Garza. Due to a time loop, Hopper lives the same day over and over. The series revolves around his attempt to solve the mystery of the murder, and find out who is behind the conspiracy to frame him.

The series aired on the ABC network, and premiered on November 15, 2006. It was cancelled on December 15 after only six episodes had aired. The remaining episodes were subsequently made available online at ABC.com. Viewers for the show averaged 6.5 million.

On March 16, 2008, the TV One cable network began airing the six previously broadcast episodes.  On April 20, the network began Sunday evening broadcasts of the remaining seven episodes, which had never been seen on television.

Synopsis
Los Angeles Detective Brett Hopper is inexplicably repeating the same day, on which he is framed for the murder of the Assistant District Attorney, Alberto Garza.  Hopper attempts to clear his name and uncover the truth, in the process discovering a conspiracy with ties to those close to him.  He also struggles to understand what is happening to him, and learns that at least one other person may be repeating the same day.  With every reset of the loop, Hopper wakes at his girlfriend Rita's home as the clock turns from 6:17 to 6:18 a.m.  He retains his memories, as well as his physical body and any injuries.  Anyone outside of the loop has no awareness or memory of the repeating day, nor do they retain injuries from previous iterations.  However, after Hopper experiences profound changes in his relationships with his partner Andrea and with Rita, respectively, their behaviors are altered going forward in the loop.

Cast and characters

Main characters
 Brett Hopper, played by Taye Diggs, the main character of the show. He is a detective who is framed for the murder of Assistant District Attorney Alberto Garza.
 Rita Shelten, played by Moon Bloodgood, Brett's girlfriend. She is a nurse and is targeted by those who are framing Brett.
 Jennifer Mathis, played by Meta Golding, Brett's sister. She is a school teacher.
 Andrea Battle, played by Victoria Pratt, Brett's current partner. She is also a detective and is being investigated by Internal Affairs because of some shady dealings with her informer "Slim". She is romantically involved with Eddie Reyes, a former cop with a drug addiction.
 Damien Ortiz, played by Ramón Rodríguez, Brett's informant. He is a gang member who decided to turn against his gang. His safe house was ambushed the night before the repeating day, but he escaped.
 Chad Shelten, played by Adam Baldwin, Brett's former partner. He is now a detective in Internal Affairs. He is also Rita's ex-husband.

Supporting characters

Episodes

* = World premiere on ABC.com^ = Television premiere on TV One
 
Viewers for the series on television averaged 6.5 million.

Broadcast and cancelation
About the cancelation, Taye Diggs: "We didn’t get enough viewers. The network gave us a shot, and that’s what happened. I had a really great time on the show. It was one of the best scripts out there. It was the timing.  Who knows why people tune in to what they do, but apparently they were not watching us."

Moon Bloodgood gave a similar statement about the cancellation: “I thought Day Break and Journeyman were great shows. Sometimes people want to say, “Oh, they’re too intelligent.” I give audiences way more credit. I don’t think it was that we weren’t good. I think it’s timing. I think sometimes things just don’t catch fire. Maybe it wasn’t good? But I know that I thought it was good and I, to this day, think they were good. I wouldn’t have done them if I didn’t think they were good.“

Adam Baldwin was also proud of the show: “I'll tell you, Day Break holds up if you watch it. If it was on a Netflix-type format where you could just sit down and watch it chronologically, it would really hold up. I think it had a big challenge being on commercial television and having the breaks in between. It's not a linear show. Like Memento: you wouldn't want to watch that if you had to have wait a week to see the second half or whatever. But I really enjoyed that.“

Online distribution
ABC had previously said that there were problems that kept the rest of the episodes from being shown online, calling them "unforeseen music clearance issues." On January 14, 2007, the network announced that the remaining episodes would be made available by the end of February. The first six episodes which had aired on television were posted  on January 29, 2007, along with the first four unaired episodes.

The thirteenth and final episode, which was originally scheduled to be available on February 19, was delayed multiple times. After a nearly three-week wait, the finale premiered late on March 2. It was reported that the reasons for this delay concerned copyrighting issues with some of the original soundtrack from the final cut of the episode.

DVD releases
On March 25, 2008, Day Break: The Complete Series was released on DVD in Region 1 by BCI Eclipse as a 4-disc set.

Mill Creek Entertainment subsequently re-released Day Break on September 29, 2009 as a 2-disc set.

References

External links
 

2006 American television series debuts
2008 American television series endings
American Broadcasting Company original programming
2000s American crime drama television series
English-language television shows
American action television series
American crime drama television series
Serial drama television series
Television series by ABC Studios
Television shows set in Los Angeles
American time travel television series
Television series about multiple time paths
2000s American time travel television series
Time loop television series